Peter Logan (1889 – April 1944) was a Scottish professional footballer who played as an inside right. He spent 17 years with Bradford City, making over 300 appearances and winning the 1911 FA Cup Final.

Early and personal life
Born in Edinburgh, he was the younger brother of footballer James Logan, who also played for Bradford City.

Career
After playing for Alva Rangers and St Bernard's, he signed for Bradford City in October 1908. He won the 1911 FA Cup Final with  the club. During World War I he "won representative honours for his army unit". He spent 17 years with the club, making 304 appearances in total. After retiring as a player in April 1925, he worked as a coach at the club until October 1925. He then became licensee of the Girlington Hotel. He died in April 1944, aged 54.

Sources

References

1889 births
1944 deaths
20th-century British Army personnel
Military personnel from Edinburgh
Footballers from Edinburgh
Scottish footballers
St Bernard's F.C. players
Bradford City A.F.C. players
English Football League players
Association football inside forwards
Bradford City A.F.C. non-playing staff
British hoteliers
FA Cup Final players
British Army personnel of World War I